The G-14 was an organisation of European football clubs that existed between 1998 and 2008. It consisted of 14 European top class teams initially, later expanded to 18. It was disbanded in 2008 and was replaced by the European Club Association representing over 100 clubs, in a deal reached with UEFA and FIFA.

Composition
The G-14 clubs were spread across seven countries, and had won around 250 national league titles (although some of the member teams, Bayer Leverkusen for example, had actually never won top league title throughout their history). Three came from the top division of Italy; two from each of Spain, France, Germany, the Netherlands, and England; and one came from Portugal. G-14 members had won the European Cup/Champions League 41 times out of 51 seasons.

The 2004 Champions League final was the first in that competition since 1992 in which one of the finalists was not a G-14 member; the 2004 final featured member FC Porto and non-member AS Monaco, with Porto winning the final. There have been only four Champions League or European Cup finals where both teams were non-members of G-14 (1970, 1979, 1980).

History
The G-14 was founded on October 14th in 1998 by 14 leading clubs to provide a unified voice in negotiations with UEFA and FIFA. New members could join by invitation only. In August 2002, four more clubs joined, taking the membership to 18, although the organisation retained its original name.

As the leading clubs in European Football, their power on the world stage was best demonstrated during the 2006 FIFA World Cup, where they provided 22% of participating players. This supported their assertion that national associations should pay players' wages whilst on international duty and provide compensation in the case of injuries. In April 2004, G-14 initiated a preliminary investigation into FIFA by the Swiss Competition Commission, when they complained of FIFA's requiring their players to be available for FIFA international competitions without compensating the clubs. FIFA president Sepp Blatter refused to negotiate with the G-14 on the matter.

On 5 September 2005, the G-14 clubs decided to take FIFA to court over paying players for internationals after the Belgian club Charleroi lost Abdelmajid Oulmers in November for eight months when he was injured playing for Morocco.

Prior to the 2006 World Cup, the G-14 members demanded a "fair percentage" of receipts from tournaments, such as the World Cup, to compensate for the clubs releasing players to compete in these tournaments.

The last president of the group was Olympique Lyonnais chairman Jean-Michel Aulas, who replaced David Dein, who stepped down after six months of a two-year presidency after leaving Arsenal. Aulas was elected president on 16 May 2007, after securing unanimous agreement from member clubs to the principle of expanding the G-14's membership. Aulas announced his intention to consider inviting a further 16 teams to join, stating that he wanted the G14 "to expand geographically and be strengthened by other clubs". In October 2007, 22 additional European clubs were invited to participate in talks towards expansion.

On 28 May 2007, at an extraordinary meeting of the UEFA Congress in Zürich, UEFA President Michel Platini called upon G-14 to disband, declaring that they were "elitist" and that club grievances could be aired through a new UEFA body, the Professional Football Strategy Council.

On 15 January 2008, the G-14 and UEFA came to an agreement. FIFA and UEFA would pay compensation for international injuries and selection after a World Cup or European Championship and, in return, the G-14 agreed to disband on 15 February 2008. However a new European Club Association, created in that year by a merge between the G-14 and the European Club Forum, a task force created by the confederation in 2002 and composed by 103 clubs from then 53 nations affiliated to UEFA (at least one team from each country), including all G-14 clubs, was set up in its place.

Members
Founding members, 1998
 Real Madrid (Spain)
 Barcelona (Spain)
 Manchester United (England)
 Liverpool (England)
 Internazionale (Italy)
 Juventus (Italy)
 Milan (Italy)
 Marseille (France)
 Paris Saint-Germain (France)
 Bayern Munich (Germany)
 Borussia Dortmund (Germany)
 Ajax (Netherlands)
 PSV Eindhoven (Netherlands)
 Porto (Portugal)

New members, 2002
 Arsenal (England)
 Bayer Leverkusen (Germany) 
 Lyon (France)
 Valencia (Spain)

See also
 Proposals for a European Super League in association football – A project for a sole pan-European Football League in which G-14 has been involved

References

External links
Official website

Association football organizations
International sports organizations
Sports organizations established in 1998
Organizations disestablished in 2008
Defunct association football governing bodies